The Makó Neological Synagogue was a large Jewish religious building in Makó, Hungary.

History 
At the end of the 19th century, Mako's prominent and socially neologous Jews decided to build a new synagogue. The new synagogue was built perpendicular to Eötvös Street, according to the plans of Lipót Baumhorn, inaugurated in 1914. Above the square of the central building, the dome on the octagonal hill, the eastern wing of the octagonal lock and the two chapel-like staircases surrounding it, and its semicircular twin-windowed windows, resembled Baumhorn's synagogue in Eger.

After World War II, the synagogue lost its role after the destruction of the Mako Jewry. In the 1950s and 1960s, several ideas for recycling were born, but eventually it was decommissioned.

Sources 
 (szerk.) Gerő László: Magyarországi zsinagógák, Műszaki Könyvkiadó, Budapest, 1989, 126–127. o.

Photo 
 https://www.delmagyar.hu/mako-es-kornyeke/volt-egyszer-egy-makoi-zsinagoga-3060181/

Synagogues in Hungary
Neolog Judaism synagogues
Destroyed synagogues